Alumniportal Deutschland is a non-profit online social network of "Germany Alumni" – designed for anyone from around the world who has studied, researched, worked or completed a (further) training or a language course in Germany or at a German institution abroad.

Overview 
It offers the opportunity to get in touch with Germany-Alumni from around the world as well as companies in order to discuss special interest topics, develop their skills and benefit from the expertise of others. The portal is a networking platform for both the professional and private field. It is open to any and all international Germany Alumni, regardless of whether or not they received a scholarship from one of the many German scholarship organizations, participated in an organized study abroad program, or enrolled directly in an institution. The registration and use of Alumniportal Deutschland is free of charge and can be done as individual or as business/organization.

The project is administered by a core group of four major German organizations (Alexander von Humboldt Foundation, German Academic Exchange Service, Goethe-Institut, Gesellschaft für Internationale Zusammenarbeit), supported by strategic partners and financed by the Federal Ministry for Economic Cooperation and Development of Germany and supported by the Federal Foreign Office.

The Alumniportal Deutschland is available in both English and German. The communication language within the community is arbitrary.

Background / history 
German alumni relations departments and professional development organizations in Germany have historically been limited to each group reaching out to their specific alumni. However, approximately 80% of people from abroad who study or undertake professional training in Germany – a total of roughly 14,000 people per year – are “free movers”, organizing and financing their own program. Trying to get in touch with these free movers was a complicated and often fruitless effort.

Alumniportal Deutschland is an online social network created entirely for Germany Alumni, regardless of organizational affiliation. Bringing this group of individuals together is aimed at creating tangible benefits for the Germany Alumni, for the various scholarship organizations, and for companies and institutions looking for highly qualified individuals with experience in Germany.

Since its inception in 2008, more than 155,000 users, from 184 countries have registered with the Alumniportal (as of December 2017).

Structure of the website 
The Alumniportal Deutschland is divided into various sections: the Online Community, Topics & Projects, Webinars & Events and a section on Jobs & Careers, Groups, Members & Network.

The Online Community is the social networking component of the website. Registered members have the opportunity to network and communicate with fellow alumni and participating organizations using the standard array of social networking tools such as groups, blogs, profiles, etc.

Partner organizations 
The four primary non-profit and non-governmental organizations responsible for creating, maintaining and promoting Alumniportal Deutschland are:
 Alexander von Humboldt Foundation (AvH; in German: Alexander von Humboldt-Stiftung)
 Deutsche Gesellschaft für Internationale Zusammenarbeit (GIZ)
 German Academic Exchange Service (DAAD; in German: Deutscher Akademischer Austauschdienst)
 Goethe-Institut

More than ten "strategic partners" support the partner organizations. Amongst others, these are the German Federal Foreign Office, the German Federal Ministry of Education and Research, and several political foundations such as the Friedrich Ebert Foundation, the Konrad Adenauer Foundation and the Heinrich Boell Foundation.

References

External links
 Alumniportal Deutschland English homepage
 Alumniportal Deutschland German homepage

Alumni associations
German social networking websites
Online companies of Germany
Non-profit corporations